Sedgewick is a town in central Alberta, Canada. The Canadian Pacific Railway runs through the town.

Demographics 

In the 2016 Census of Population conducted by Statistics Canada, the Town of Sedgewick recorded a population of 811 living in 366 of its 401 total private dwellings, a  change from its 2011 population of 857.

See also 
List of communities in Alberta
List of towns in Alberta

References

External links 

1907 establishments in Alberta
Towns in Alberta